Roger A. Nicoll (born 1941) is an American neuroscientist at the University of California, San Francisco where he is professor at the Department of Cellular and Molecular Pharmacology.

Nicoll grew up in Princeton, New Jersey. He studied biology and chemistry at Lawrence University in Appleton, Wisconsin before he shifted to medical studies at University of Rochester School of Medicine where he obtained a M.D in 1968. In between he studied electrophysiology for one year at National Institutes of Health where he later returned to work as a researcher. Subsequently, he got a position with the State University of New York in 1973  where he worked with John Eccles whose work he had got interested in after reading a book by Eccles about using electrodes to record impulses from neurons.

Nicoll has served on the editorial board of the Journal of Physiology.

List of awards and honors 
1989 Alden Spencer Award
1994 Member of National Academy of Sciences
1998 Lucia Russell Briggs Distinguished Achievement Award, Lawrence University
1999 Bristol Myers Squibb Investigator
1999 Member of American Academy of Arts and Sciences
2004 Heinrich Wieland Prize
2006 Gruber Prize in Neuroscience
2006 Perl-UNC Prize in Neuroscience
2008 J. Allyn Taylor International Prize, Robarts Research Institute.
2010 National Academy of Science - Neuroscience Award
2011 Pasarow Award in Neuroscience
2011 Axelrod Prize - Society for Neuroscience
2012 Scolnick Prize for neuroscience - MIT
2014 Grass Lecture - Society for Neuroscience
2014 Ralph W. Gerard Prize - Society for Neuroscience
2014 Warren Alpert Foundation Prize - Harvard University

References 

1941 births
Living people
People from Princeton, New Jersey
Lawrence University alumni
University of Rochester alumni
University of California, San Francisco faculty
American neuroscientists
Members of the United States National Academy of Sciences
Fellows of the American Academy of Arts and Sciences